16th parallel may refer to:

16th parallel north, a circle of latitude in the Northern Hemisphere
16th parallel south, a circle of latitude in the Southern Hemisphere